Lipochaeta lobata is a species of flowering plant in the family Asteraceae known by the common name shrubland nehe. It is endemic to Hawaii, where it can be found in coastal dry shrublands and dry forests on Oahu, Maui, and Niihau.

There are two varieties of this species. One, var. leptophylla, is a federally listed endangered species of the United States.

References

External links

USDA Plants Profile

Heliantheae
Endemic flora of Hawaii